Maxime Valet (born 18 May 1987 in Toulouse) is a French wheelchair fencer. He represented France at the 2016 Summer Paralympics in Rio de Janeiro, Brazil and he won two medals: the bronze medal in the men's foil B event and the bronze medal in the men's team foil event. He also won the bronze medal in the men's team foil event at the 2020 Summer Paralympics held in Tokyo, Japan.

In 2009, Valet became paraplegic after falling into a hole at a construction site.

References

External links 
 
 

1987 births
Living people
French male foil fencers
Paralympic wheelchair fencers of France
Paralympic bronze medalists for France
Paralympic medalists in wheelchair fencing
Wheelchair fencers at the 2016 Summer Paralympics
Wheelchair fencers at the 2020 Summer Paralympics
Medalists at the 2016 Summer Paralympics
Medalists at the 2020 Summer Paralympics
Sportspeople from Toulouse